Rhys Montague Darby (born 21 March 1974) is a New Zealand actor and comedian, known for his energetic physical comedy routines, telling stories accompanied with mime and sound effects of things such as machinery and animals. He was nominated for the Billy T Award in 2001 and 2002. He also won the 2012 Fred (Dagg) award at the New Zealand International Comedy Festival, for best NZ show.

Darby is best known for playing Murray Hewitt, the band manager of Flight of the Conchords in the television series, a role he originally played in the BBC radio series under the name Brian Nesbit, and for playing the boss of Jim Carrey's character in Yes Man, as well as roles in What We Do in the Shadows, The Boat That Rocked, Jumanji: Welcome to the Jungle, A Series of Unfortunate Events, Voltron: Legendary Defender, Psycho Sam in Hunt for the Wilderpeople, Rise of the Teenage Mutant Ninja Turtles, Crash Bandicoot in Skylanders Academy, and Half-Life: Alyx. Starting March 2022, he starred as Stede Bonnet alongside Taika Waititi in the HBO Max period romantic comedy series Our Flag Means Death.

Early life
Darby was born in Auckland and was brought up in the suburb of Pakuranga. He attended Edgewater College. A former soldier (signaller trained in morse code), he left the New Zealand Army in 1994 and began studies at the University of Canterbury. In 1996 he formed a comedy duo, Rhysently Granted, with Grant Lobban. After winning an open mic contest at Southern Blues Bar in Christchurch, they began performing at local venues.

Career

Rhysently Granted performed at two international comedy festivals which led to Darby moving back to Auckland to seek more solo stand-up experience. After performing his first solo show at the 2002 Edinburgh Festival Fringe, Darby moved to the UK to pursue his career further.

In 2004 he appeared in the Flight of the Conchords BBC radio series as the band's manager Brian Nesbit alongside comedy stars such as Rob Brydon, Andy Parsons and Jimmy Carr. Darby's character was renamed to Murray Hewitt, the band's manager, for the Flight of the Conchords TV show. He provided vocals for the track "Leggy Blonde" on their self-titled first album and also in the second series of the show on the track "Rejected" during the episode "A Good Opportunity" alongside tenor Andrew Drost.

Darby played the role of Norman, the boss of Jim Carrey's character in Yes Man. In July 2008 he appeared in a Nike advertisement featuring Roger Federer; he played an impostor posing as Federer's coach.

He appeared on a British children's television programme The Slammer during its first series. He also appeared in several advertisements for New Zealand mobile phone company 2degrees. He appeared on Soccer AM on 18 October 2008 and on Never Mind The Buzzcocks on 23 October. The DVD of his live performance Imagine That! has gone platinum in New Zealand.

Rhys Darby's hair colour is self-described as Electric Copper in the episode of Flight of the Conchords entitled Murray Takes It to the Next Level. He refers to this in his stand-up show It's Rhys Darby Night which he performed at the Edinburgh Festival Fringe from 6–15 August 2009, The Bloomsbury Theatre in London from 27 July – 1 August and toured around New Zealand with in October and November that year.

Darby played the role of Angus in the Richard Curtis film The Boat That Rocked released in the UK on 1 April 2009. This film was released in some countries in November 2009 under the name Pirate Radio.

In 2009 while home in New Zealand he began filming TV ads for NZ's new mobile network 2degrees and appearing in NZ shows Rocked the Nation 2, Jaquie Brown Diaries and Intrepid Journeys. He has also branched out into producing live comedy with his wife and their company Awesomeness International. At the NZ International Comedy Festival they produced shows for local comedians. Darby became a climate ambassador for Greenpeace in its Sign on climate campaign and published a poem and video in support of the campaign.

In 2009 Darby became a part of the New Zealand TV ONE series Intrepid Journeys, Season 5, touring Rwanda. On 10 August 2010, Entertainment Weekly claimed that Darby was in consideration for a role in the television series The Office after Steve Carell left at the end of the 2011 season, however this did not materialise.

In May 2011, he also filmed a pilot for a Channel 4 sitcom in the UK, The Fun Police. The pilot was broadcast on 16 September. In 2011, Darby and family moved to the US for Darby to take a role in the CBS sitcom How to Be a Gentleman. Darby's second DVD "It's Rhys Darby Night!" was released in NZ on 12 December 2011.

He wrote a self-described "autobiographical space novel" entitled This Way to Spaceship, which was released on 12 April 2012. On 20 May 2012, Darby was awarded the Fred Award by the New Zealand International Comedy Festival for his show of the same name as his book.

In 2013, he was responsible for flying 'Cornish rappers' Hedluv + Passman to New Zealand for the New Zealand International Comedy Festival. This was followed by an appearance on Seven Sharp, where he introduced 'his rappers' to the New Zealand public.

Since 2013, Darby has co-hosted the cryptozoology-focused podcast The Cryptid Factor with Dan Schreiber, David Farrier and producer Leon 'Buttons' Kirkbeck.

Darby climbed to the summit of Mount Kilimanjaro in July 2013 as part of a World Vision team of celebrities that included Olympian Mahé Drysdale and musician Boh Runga. On 8 November 2013, Darby made an appearance and performed some standup comedy in his capacity as second guest on the Late Show with David Letterman. He portrayed Anton in the 2014 release comedy horror film What We Do in the Shadows.

As of July 2014, Darby and his family reside in Los Angeles, California.

In February 2016, he played Guy Mann in the third episode ("Mulder and Scully Meet the Were-Monster") of season 10 of The X-Files. Darby, a long time fan of the show, was thrilled by his experience on set. He saw this as an opportunity that only comes around every so often and said he'd return to the set the first chance he received.

In 2018, Darby participated in a video together with Prime Minister of New Zealand Jacinda Ardern as part of a tourism campaign for the country in which discussed why New Zealand was being excluded from world maps so frequently. Darby appeared on the panel show Patriot Brains in 2021.

In 2022, he starred in the HBO Max show Our Flag Means Death as pirate Stede Bonnet. Our Flag Means Death received praise for its non-binary and LGBTQ representation, in part due to the romantic relationship between Bonnet and Blackbeard, played by co-star Taika Waititi.

Filmography

Film

Television

Television appearances as himself
{| class="wikitable"
|-
!Year
!Title
|-
| 2001–2002 || Billy T Award
|-
| 2005 || Mighty Truck of Stuff
|-
| 2006 || The Slammer
|-
| 2007–2008 || Sounds Like a Laugh
|-
| 2008 || Yo Gabba Gabba!
|-
| 2008 || The Comedy Store Live
|-
| 2009 || Rocked the Nation 2: 100 NZ Pop Culture Moments
|-
| 2009 || Spicks and Specks
|-
| 2009 || Thank God You're Here
|-
| 2009 || ROVE
|-
| 2009 || Intrepid Journeys
|-
| 2009–2012 || 7 Days
|-
| 2010 || The Qantas TV and Film Awards
|-
| 2011 || A Quiet Word With ...
|-
| 2011 || The Rob Brydon Show
|-
| 2012 || Mad Mad World
|-
| 2012 || Sunday Brunch
|-
| 2012 || The Comedy Marathon Spectacular
|-
| 2012 || QI
|-
| 2013–2017 || @midnight
|-
| 2013 || Late Show with David Letterman
|-
| 2014 || No, You Shut Up!
|-
| 2016 || The Café
|-
| 2016–17 || Whose Line is it Anyway? Australia
|-
| 2021 || The Masked Singer NZ
|-
| 2021 || Patriot Brains|}

Comedy specials
 Imagine That! (2008)
 It's Rhys Darby Night! (2011)
 This Way to Spaceship (2012)
 I'm a Fighter Jet (2017)
 Mystic Time Bird (2021)
 You've Seen My Stand Up, Now See It... Again!'' (2022)

Video games

References

External links

Official website
Interview in The Apiary
Interview on The Rock radio station

1974 births
Living people
New Zealand Army personnel
New Zealand male comedians
New Zealand stand-up comedians
New Zealand expatriates in the United States
New Zealand male television actors
University of Canterbury alumni
Place of birth missing (living people)
People from Auckland
New Zealand people of Welsh descent
Expatriate male actors in the United States
New Zealand podcasters
New Zealand male voice actors